Jeison Alexander Suárez (born 21 March 1991) is a male long-distance runner from Colombia. He won the gold medal in the men's half marathon at the 2017 Bolivarian Games and the men's marathon at the 2018 Central American and Caribbean Games. He represented Colombia at the 2020 Summer Olympics.

References

External links

1991 births
Living people
People from Tolima Department
Colombian male long-distance runners
Colombian male marathon runners
Olympic athletes of Colombia
Athletes (track and field) at the 2019 Pan American Games
Athletes (track and field) at the 2020 Summer Olympics
Competitors at the 2018 Central American and Caribbean Games
Central American and Caribbean Games gold medalists for Colombia
Central American and Caribbean Games medalists in athletics
20th-century Colombian people
21st-century Colombian people